is located on the island of Iejima in Ie, Kunigami District, Okinawa Prefecture, Japan. The runways were part of the Ie Shima Airfield complex built during World War II. In 2015, the government was planning for Iejima Airport to have a new terminal and to expand the runway to 2,000 meters in length to enable the airport to accommodate jet service.

See also
Naval Base Okinawa

References

External links
 Iejima Airport
 

Airports in Okinawa